Anees is a given name that may refer to:
Anees (horse) (1997–2003), American Thoroughbred racehorse
Anees Ahmed, Indian lawyer
Anees Bazmee, Indian film producer and director 
Anees Jung (born 1964), Indian author and journalist
Anees Salim, Indian author
Anees Mokhiber, American-born Lebanese-Palestinian musician and rapper

See also
Anis (disambiguation)